Dock10 is a television facility owner and media services company in the City of Salford, Greater Manchester, England. Dock10 offers a number of services including post production and The Studios.

Its studio filming facility, often referred to as The Studios, is the best-known part of the company. It was built as a major part of MediaCityUK, a development in Salford, Greater Manchester. The move saw a number of major productions leave London for the first time and head north to Manchester. The BBC, ITV and Channel 4 all relocated the filming of various shows to The Studios. This included established British shows Match of the Day and Countdown.

Dock10 also offers other media services, such as post production. Their post-production shows include Match of the Day, Blue Peter and Who Wants to Be a Millionaire?.

History

The idea for MediaCityUK began in 2004, when BBC announced that it was interested in moving hundreds of jobs away from London to another UK city. The Peel Group was involved from the early stages of this move, which resulted in announcing the construction of a 200-acre development in Salford Quays, Greater Manchester. The BBC and The Peel Group announced in 2007 that the construction would begin on the media-based development.

The studio facility is built on the site of the former Manchester Ship Canal docks. Construction of dock10 began in 2007, and it was ready to go on air in January 2011. It was officially opened by Queen Elizabeth II in March 2012. The name "dock10" is said to come from a site plan drawn over 100 years ago that stated, "SITE OF FUTURE DOCK NO. 10".

At the heart of the MediaCityUK project was the idea of producing BBC shows outside London. A studio was then proposed at the site, which was constructed in time for the BBC move in 2011. The new £22 million studio was originally known as MediaCityUK studios, before becoming The Studios. The BBC became the first major tenant of The Studios. The Studios and the media infrastructure were rebranded in 2012, and Dock10 was formed.

In 2013, Dock10 signed its first production deal with ITV. The deal was to use dock10 to record and produce a number of ITV Studios shows, and was extended in 2016 to run until 2018.

By 2016, Dock10 had grown into a major production provider to British-based TV shows. In March 2016, Dock10 announced that it had acquired Edit 19, a Manchester-based visual effects and editing company. Later that year, it announced that it was expanding its post-production facility, offering many services gained from the acquisition of Edit 19.

In May 2017, Dock10 opened a new studio, HQ8, suitable for small sets and green-screen productions. This studio was designed to meet the demands from creative agencies and digital content creators wanting to use professional facilities.

In November 2017, Dock10 announced that it had secured a contract with BBC Creative. This would mean certain BBC promos and branding work would be produced outside of London.

Since the 2018 revival of Who Wants to Be a Millionaire?, the show has been filmed at Dock10. It was previously filmed at Elstree Studios in Hertfordshire.

In January 2019, ITV Studios announced plans to remain at Dock10 until at least 2021. The extended contract meant the company's shows would continue to be filmed and produced on site, which included shows such as Judge Rinder and (as of May 2019, cancelled) The Jeremy Kyle Show.

The post-production facilities at Dock10 were expanded in 2019 as part of a wider £5 million investment to meet increased demand. The expansion included a new creative production space called The Second Floor, which provides additional space for production companies. The new facilities include fourteen edit suites, audio tracklay, and dubbing suites.

In May 2019, Dock10 announced the launch of a new 4K UHD-ready virtual studio capability using Epic Games' Unreal Engine 4. This technology allows programme makers to create photorealistic output in real time.

In August 2019, Dock10 is to host JD Sports inaugural Esports event, JDX, with the semi-finals and finals being hosted at the facility.

For the launch of the 2019-20 football season, BBC Sport announced that its football shows Match of the Day and Match of the Day 2 would be broadcast from a virtual reality studio at Dock10. This studio will also be used by other BBC football programs including Final Score and Football Focus.

Channel 4 has commissioned a new peak-time Christmas-themed four-part series Buy it Now, to be hosted by Rylan Clark-Neal. Buy It Now is produced by Studio Lambert North and will be filmed at Dock10.

Studio facilities

The studios are owned and managed by Dock10. The company has two major divisions: studios and post-production. The studios feature eight conventional TV studios, two audio studios, two unique spaces used for television production, digital post-production, and cloud media management services.

Many major productions such as The Voice UK are filmed in HQ1, the UK's biggest multi-camera TV studio, which can hold live audiences of up to 1,000 people. HQ2, HQ3, and HQ4 are three large or medium-sized studios, with shows such as Match of the Day, The Voice UK, Football Focus, Countdown, Judge Rinder and University Challenge filmed in the four studios.

Shows with a smaller studio requirement, such as Newsround, Blue Peter and Saturday Mash-Up!, use HQ5, HQ6, HQ7 or HQ8. HQ9 and HQ10 are specialist audio studios. The final two studios are large spaces for more open productions. HQ11 is the only outdoor studio on site and with HQ12 is a mezzanine studio, often seen on Watchdog.

Studio specifications

HQ1

HQ2

HQ3
HQ3 is a  television studio which can handle an audience of 200.

HQ4

HQ5 and HQ6

HQ7 

HQ8

HQ9 BBC Philharmonic Studio  

HQ10 

HQ11 Outdoor Studio
HQ11 is actually a large outdoor space in front of the studio complex, and is claimed to be  with an audience capacity of 5,000.

HQ12 Open Centre Mezzanine
HQ12 is an indoor mezzanine space at the front of the complex, with external views over HQ11 and the rest of MediaCityUK.

See also
Media in Manchester

References

External links
 Dock10 website
 Dock10 on twitter

Television studios in Greater Manchester
Salford Quays